Alyson is pop/dance singer-songwriter and producer from in Los Angeles.

Career
Alyson's debut album Take a Good Look released on her own label, PM Media, was released on May 17, 2005. The album features the hits "Baby Come Back", "What're Your Gonna Do", "Nothin' More To Say", "Feel You", "Take A Gook Look" and "Forever", the fifth song from her debut album to hit the Top 10 on the Hot Dance Club Play and to become Hot Dance Airplay hits, and hit number one on the World Dance/Trance Singles Chart. It also gained Rhythmic, Top 40 and AC format radio airplay. Alyson's second album, Hey You, was released on March 18, 2008. The title track became the lead single. It became an immediate success on the charts. The album's other hit singles are "Here With Me", "Adios Barcelona", "Sticky Sticky" and "Shoobadoo", all hitting the Top 5 on the national Hot 100 Radio Chart (Top 40 & AC) in New Music Weekly Magazine.

Discography

Albums
Take a Good Look (PM Media, 2005)
Hey You (PM Media, March 18, 2008)

Singles

References

 

American women pop singers
American soul singers
American house musicians
Singer-songwriters from California
21st-century American women singers
21st-century American singers
American women in electronic music
Living people
Year of birth missing (living people)